Jerusalem Walls National Park (also known as Jerusalem Walls-City of David National Park) is an Israeli national park located near the walls of the Old City of Jerusalem. The national park was designed originally to surround the old city from all sides, to separate between the old city and the new constructions surrounding it while at the same time connecting between them, while preventing construction near the walls.

The National park includes the site of the City of David on the southern part and connects to the Emek Tzurim National Park on the Northern-eastern part.

The area of the national park includes the Gates of the Old City of Jerusalem.

Sites located in the National Park 
 The City of David archaeological and tourism site.
 The promenade of the old city of Jerusalem. 
 The Tower of David - consists today of a museum for the History of Jerusalem and an antiquities site. 
 Mount Zion - the site includes David's Tomb, the Holocaust chamber and several holy sites for Christians, among them the Hagia Maria Sion Abbey, the Cathedral of St. James and more.
 Cemeteries - Jewish, Christian Orthodox and Protestant (Mount Zion Cemetery).

Archaeology 

The national park consists important sites of archaeological excavations as well as the Ophel Archaeological Garden, which includes archaeological finds from the Solomon's Temple period until the Ottoman period.

The eastern side of the garden includes a Muslim cemetery.

West and south of the Old City is Gehenna.

The Kidron Valley which is also located on the grounds of the National Park consists of a number of burial constructions, including Tomb of Absalom and Tomb of Zechariah.

Under the northern wall, between the Damascus Gate and Herod's Gate, is a site called Zedekiah's Cave. Researchers believe that this was a quarry from Herod's period.

See also 
Walls of Jerusalem

References

External links
the Israeli Parks Authority site

National parks of Israel
Parks in Jerusalem